Shondel Nichole Archer (born 9 December 1990) is an American-born Guyanese retired footballer who played as a forward. She has been a member of the Guyana women's national team.

Early life
Archer was raised in Woodbridge, Virginia.

High school and college career
Archer attended the Woodbridge High School in Lake Ridge, Virginia. After graduating there, she joined the University of Richmond in Richmond, Virginia. She played for the Northern Virginia Majestics.

International career
Archer qualified to play for Guyana through her parents. She capped for the Lady Jags' at senior level during the 2010 CONCACAF Women's World Cup Qualifying qualification.

See also
List of Guyana women's international footballers

References

1990 births
Living people
Citizens of Guyana through descent
Guyanese women's footballers
Women's association football forwards
Women's association football fullbacks
Guyana women's international footballers
People from Woodbridge, Virginia
Sportspeople from the Washington metropolitan area
Soccer players from Virginia
American women's soccer players
Richmond Spiders women's soccer players
African-American women's soccer players
American sportspeople of Guyanese descent
21st-century African-American sportspeople
21st-century African-American women